MDX is a Music Macro Language (MML) based format designed to be played on the X68000 series of computers. The music data is programmed then compiled into the MDX file. An optional PDX file containing PCM data may be present. 

MXDRV is a terminate and stay resident (TSR) driver for playing MDX files. An external player is required to play MDX files. MMDSP was a popular multi-format front end on the X68000 whose interface is emulated by MDXWin on the PC. MDXWin also has a unique feature over other players. It has an online database of MDX files one can access through the file browser.

The original MXDRV executable was developed by "K.MAEKAWA" and "Missy.M". It was later disassembled by "Gorry" and ported to Windows in the form of the MXDRVg DLL. These have later been ported to XMMS for UNIX platforms. Hardware based sound boards also exist for PC such as ROMEO, GIMIC and Rebirth.

X68000 sound hardware specifications 

The X68000 contains two sound chips:

 A Yamaha YM2151 (OPM) (Eight-channel FM synthesis chip)
 A single OKI MSM6258 ADPCM chip  (One-channel/4-bit/3.9/5.2/7.8/10.4/15.6 kHz).

Software mixing is available, allowing for up to 8 PCM channels through drivers such as PCM8 and Rydeen.

Later on in the system's life, an expansion card called the Marcury-Unit was released that provided 16-bit stereo PCM with 48 kHz output, as well as dual Yamaha YMF288 (OPN3) sound chips providing 12 FM channels, 6 SSG channels, and 12 ADPCM channels.

Music notation file formats
X68000
Video game music file formats